Robert William "Bob" Harper, Jr. (born ) is a computer science professor at Carnegie Mellon University who works in programming language research. Prior to his position at Carnegie Mellon, Harper was a research fellow at the University of Edinburgh.

Career
Harper made major contributions to the design of the Standard ML programming language and the LF logical framework.

Harper was named an ACM Fellow in 2005 for his contributions to type systems for programming languages. In 2021, he received the ACM SIGPLAN Programming Languages Achievement Award for his "foundational contributions to our understanding of type theory and its use in the design, specification, implementation, and verification of modern programming languages".

Books 
Robin Milner, Mads Tofte, Robert Harper, and David MacQueen. The Definition of Standard ML (Revised). MIT Press, 1997.
Robert Harper (editor). Types in Compilation. Springer-Verlag Lecture Notes in Computer Science, volume 2071, 2001.
Robert Harper. Type Systems for Programming Languages. Draft, 2000.
Robert Harper. Programming in Standard ML. Working Draft, 2013.
Robert Harper.  Practical Foundations for Programming Languages, 2007 draft. 2nd edition: , 2016.

Personal life

In 2003–2008, Harper hosted the progressive talk show Left Out on WRCT-FM with fellow host and Carnegie Mellon University School of Computer Science faculty member Danny Sleator.

References

Bibliography 
 Robert Harper's Homepage
 Existential Type, Robert Harper's blog

Programming language researchers
Carnegie Mellon University faculty
Living people
Fellows of the Association for Computing Machinery
Year of birth missing (living people)
Place of birth missing (living people)